In Love With Oblivion is the second studio album by Brooklyn-based band Crystal Stilts, which was released on April 11, 2011 in the UK and April 12 in the US. The album is the follow-up to 2010's "Shake the Shackles" 7-inch and 2008's debut Alight of Night.

Reception
It went on to receive much critical acclaim, being praised for expanding and even "perfecting" their sound according to Tim Sendra of the Allmusic guide, it achieved an even higher aggregate score on Metacritic than their lauded debut. While Doug Mosurock of Dusted Magazine and Other Music declared it a "blaring masterpiece," Edward Comentale, director of Undergraduate studies at Indiana University, in his 4-star review for Tiny Mix Tapes stated, "As we trek across these dark plains of sound, the manic bop of early rockabilly becomes the dark buzz of surf-rock psychedelia becomes the hip sleaze of States-side punk. Don’t mind the warning beep in the background; sinister American pop — whether it’s Johnny Cash or Jim Morrison or Joey Ramone — never felt so good." AU Magazine, in a 9 out of 10 review, said simply, "Crystal Stilts have scaled the peaks of Noise-pop and have created a sublime album in doing so."

Culturespill did a feature on it in their 'Best Albums of 2011' Series. Rob Gannon of [Sic] Magazine would place In Love with Oblivion at #6 in his top 50 albums of 2011, describing it as an "Iconic sounding, 60s psyche-indebted garage masterpiece that reels from classic to classic... Crystal Stilts are fast becoming one of America’s best bands."

Seminal artists in independent music also confessed their admiration for In Love with Oblivion. Bradford Cox of Deerhunter, one of the most respected artists in independent music, would go on to name it the album of the year along with companion EP Radiant Door. Martin Bramah, founding member of legends The Fall (band) and creative force behind The Blue Orchids declared In Love with Oblivion his 9th favorite album of all time. He called it "timeless" and described it such, "You can hear all their influences up front, but they’re all put together in a fresh and exciting way, with wit and intelligence and a kind of noir nonchalance." He then relates a humorous anecdote, "Imagine if you will, Jim Morrison's nerdy kid brother unearths a huge, ancient conspiracy and decides to form a garage band so the world might come to understand - yeah, something like that is going on here."

Track listing
 "Sycamore Tree" - 5:16
 "Through the Floor" - 2:23
 "Silver Sun" - 3:03
 "Alien Rivers" - 7:18
 "Half a Moon" - 2:44
 "Flying Into the Sun" - 3:34
 "Shake the Shackles" - 3:57
 "Precarious Stair" - 3:11
 "Invisible City" - 4:47
 "Blood Barons" - 3:57
 "Prometheus At Large" - 3:34

Personnel
Brad Hargett - vocals
JB Townsend - guitar
Kyle Forester - keyboards
Andy Adler - bass guitar
Keegan Cooke - drums

References

2011 albums
Crystal Stilts albums
Slumberland Records albums
Fortuna Pop! Records albums